Central Dunbartonshire was a county constituency of the House of Commons of the Parliament of the United Kingdom (Westminster) from 1974 to 1983. It elected one Member of Parliament (MP) by the first past the post system of election.

Boundaries 

The constituency was created as a result of the Second Periodical Review of the Boundary Commission, and first used in the February 1974 general election.

The review took account of population growth in the county of Dunbarton, caused by overspill from the city of Glasgow into the new town of Cumbernauld and elsewhere, and Central Dunbartonshire was defined as one of three constituencies to replace the two constituencies of East Dunbartonshire and West Dunbartonshire. The other two constituencies took forward the names of the earlier constituencies.

Central Dunbartonshire consisted mainly of the burgh of Clydebank, but it also included the burgh of Milngavie and the Old Kilpatrick district of the county.

The same boundaries were used also for the general elections of October 1974 and 1979.

The constituency was represented by Hugh McCartney, who had previously been MP for East Dunbartonshire, throughout its relatively short existence.  Its main claim to fame is that it was the scene of Jimmy Reid's candidature in 1974, when he gained the best vote by a Communist candidate for some time.

In 1975, under the Local Government (Scotland) Act 1973, Scottish counties were abolished in favour of regions and districts and islands council areas, and the county of Dunbarton was divided between several districts of the new region of Strathclyde. The Third Periodical Review took account of new local government boundaries, and the results were implemented for the 1983 general election.

Members of Parliament

Elections of the 1970s

Notes and references 

Historic parliamentary constituencies in Scotland (Westminster)
Politics of the Dunbartonshire
Politics of East Dunbartonshire
Politics of West Dunbartonshire
Constituencies of the Parliament of the United Kingdom established in 1974
Constituencies of the Parliament of the United Kingdom disestablished in 1983

ar:دونبارتونشير الشرقية (دائرة إنتخابية في المملكة المتحدة)